Thomas Browne (1708–1780), Garter Principal King of Arms, the second son of John Browne of Ashbourne, Derbyshire, became Bluemantle Pursuivant in 1737, Lancaster Herald in 1743, Norroy and Ulster King of Arms in 1761, and Garter in 1774 until his death.

Biography
Browne was the most eminent land surveyor in the kingdom, and was called Sense Browne, to distinguish him from his contemporary, Lancelot Brown, who was usually called Capability Brown. At first he resided at his seat of Little Wimley near Stevenage, Hertfordshire, which "he received with his wife." He later moved to Camville Place, Essendon. Browne died at his town house in St. James's Street (now called Great James Street), Bedford Row, on 22 February 1780. His portrait was engraved by W. Dickinson, from a painting by Nathaniel Dance-Holland.

Arms

References

People from Ashbourne, Derbyshire
1708 births
1780 deaths
English officers of arms
Garter Principal Kings of Arms